Hoadley is a surname. Notable people with the surname include:

 Abel Hoadley (1844–1918), confectioner
 David Hoadley (architect) (1774–1839), American architect
 David Hoadley (businessman) (1806–1873), American businessman
 David K. Hoadley, the earliest known storm chaser
 Charles Hoadley (1887–1947), Australian geologist, Antarctic explorer and Scout Leader.
 Jon Hoadley (born 1983), American politician
 R. Bruce Hoadley, professor
 Rob Hoadley (born 1980), rugby player
 Silas Hoadley (1786–1870), American clockmaker